Janusaurus is an extinct genus of ophthalmosaurid ichthyosaur from the Upper Jurassic Slottsmøya
Member, Agardhfjellet Formation of Central Spitsbergen. In 2019, Janusaurus was synonymized with Arthropterygius, though maintained as a separate species, by Nikolay Zverkov and Natalya Prilepskaya, although this synonymy was objected to later that same year by Lene Delsett and colleagues, who maintained that they were sufficiently different to warrant separate genera.

Gallery

See also 
 List of ichthyosaurs
 Timeline of ichthyosaur research

References 

Ophthalmosaurinae
Ichthyosaurs of Europe
Late Jurassic ichthyosaurs
Late Jurassic reptiles of Europe
Tithonian life
Fossils of Svalbard
Agardhfjellet Formation
Fossil taxa described in 2014
Ichthyosauromorph genera